Dewitt "Dewey" Wagner Lyle (March 23, 1891 - November 27, 1980) was a professional American football offensive lineman in the American Professional Football Association and the National Football League. He played four seasons in APFA/NFL split between the Rock Island Independents and the Green Bay Packers. However Lyle also played for the Minneapolis Marines, from 1916 to 1919, prior to that team's entry into the NFL.

References

1891 births
1980 deaths
Players of American football from Minneapolis
American football offensive linemen
Minneapolis Marines players
Rock Island Independents players
Green Bay Packers players
Minnesota Golden Gophers football players